Roberto Mozzini (born 22 October 1951) is a retired Italian professional footballer who played defender.

Career
Born in Sustinente, Mozzini began his career with Torino. He made his Serie A debut against Internazionale on 7 November 1971.

Honours
Inter
 Serie A champion: 1975–76, 1979–80.

References

External links
 

1951 births
Living people
Italian footballers
Italy international footballers
Italy under-21 international footballers
Serie A players
Torino F.C. players
Inter Milan players
Bologna F.C. 1909 players
Alma Juventus Fano 1906 players

Association football defenders